Shoemaker Point is an unincorporated community located in the town of Union, Door County, Wisconsin, United States. Named Shoemaker's point after Frank Renard who was a cobbler by trade.

From space

References

Unincorporated communities in Door County, Wisconsin
Unincorporated communities in Wisconsin